Edward "Red" Jacobs was an American baseball pitcher in the Negro leagues. He played with the Newark Eagles in 1944.

References

External links
 and Seamheads

Newark Eagles players
Year of birth missing
Year of death missing
Baseball pitchers